Jean Evelyn Nidetch  (née Slutsky, October 12, 1923 – April 29, 2015) was an American business entrepreneur who was the founder of the Weight Watchers organization.

Early life
Jean Nidetch was born on October 12, 1923 in the New York City borough of Brooklyn to her parents, David and Mae Slutsky. Hailing from a working class family, Jean’s parents worked as a cab driver and a manicurist. Graduating from the Girls High School in Bedford, Jean’s academic talents led her to a scholarship offer from Long Island University. She chose, instead, to attend the City College of New York, where she majored in business administration.

Career
Jean’s career began when she dropped out of school after her father died in 1942. Providing for her family, Jean began working at Mullin Furniture Company, where she earned a mere total of 10 dollars a week ($177 in 2022 dollars). She then worked a quick stint at Man O’War Publishing Company, where she produced sheets for horse players. This job ended when Fiorello La Guardia's campaign for Mayor of New York City focused on ending horse racing, which was detrimental to the industry. Jean later found work at the Internal Revenue Service.

After meeting Marty Nidetch at the Internal Revenue Service, the two married on April 20, 1947. After a few months of marriage, the young couple moved to Tulsa, Oklahoma, so Marty could take a job as a credit manager. Marty was then promoted to a manager at a store in Warren, Pennsylvania, which led to the couple’s second move in less than a year.

In February 1952, the family moved back to New York, where Marty got a job as a bus driver. Jean stayed home with their ever-growing family. Although Jean decided to stay home as a mother and homemaker, she was involved with many charities in the area, which helped her develop some of the skills she used later to make Weight Watchers a global brand.

Jean had struggled with her weight all her life, being an overweight child and young woman. Her struggles led her to the New York City Department of Health Obesity Clinic, where she was told she would need to start a strict diet. Frustrated with her progress and uncommitted to the plan given to her, she chose not to go back to the clinic, saying that the women who ran the clinic had never been overweight in their lives and did not understand the struggle.

Instead, she chose to invite six overweight women over to her house, where they could meet weekly to talk about their struggles and discuss diet tricks and tips. She did establish one rule, which was that women should consult with their doctors before entering her support group, which is a rule that Weight Watchers continues to follow to this day. This support group was the beginning of what was soon to be Weight Watchers, as Jean incorporated her group in 1963.

Word of mouth grew the brand, and what was once a small support group turned into hundreds of women seeking Jean for advice, who eventually lost 70 pounds on her diet. To cover costs, she charged 25 cents for her clientele to gain access to her plan.

In 1973, the 10th anniversary of Weight Watchers, Jean decided to step down from the company. In 1978, the company was sold to J.D. Heinz for 24 dollars per share, or 71.2 million dollars. Jean received around 7 million dollars for her shares of the company, and signed a noncompete clause that she would never start another weight-loss company. She became the face of the company and continued to be a consultant for the company.

Death

She died on April 29, 2015, of natural causes at her home in Parkland, Florida at the age of 91.

References

External links

Weight Watchers Founder Jean Nidetch
Jean Nidetch on PBS.org

1923 births
2015 deaths
American company founders
20th-century American Jews
City College of New York alumni
Diet food advocates
People from Brooklyn
Anti-obesity activists
People from Parkland, Florida
American health activists
Girls' High School alumni
21st-century American Jews